Mohammedpur is a village in Chhatak Upazila at the North-Eastern part of Bangladesh. Locally it is also known as Mamonpur. Mahammedpur is famous for the mazar (grave) of Rahimullah Shah, a Saint of Islam. Safath Shah, the father of Durbin Shah (Poet and Singer) also lived in this village. At the middle part of his life Safath Shah migrated from Mahammedpur to Durbin Tila in Chhatak.

Location
Mahammedpur is situated in the South-Eastern part of Chhatak Upazila, in Sunamganj District. The Makunda River flows at the south-east side of Mahammedpur.

Nearby village
 East: Buraia
 West: Chelar Chor
 North: Alompur
 South: Jahedpur

Population
About 1500 peoples live in Mahammedpur. 90% of the people depend on agriculture, 2% are government employees and businessman. The rest people are abroad in the United Kingdom and in the Middle East.

Education
Mahammedpur Govt. Primary School is a famous school for its performance. It started its full activity on 1973. A private school for infant namely Green Bird Kindergarten School established on 2010. The children of this village achieve their Arabic and religious education in Mahammedpur Jame- Masque.

Communication
People use Chhatak-Gobindagonj-Dularbazar Road and Sylhet-Bishawnath-Singerkach Road for communication with Mahammedpur.

See also
 Jahedpur
 Chhatak
 Sunamganj
 Sylhet

References

Villages in Chhatak Upazila